Aida Oset (Barcelona, September 3, 1983) is a Spanish television, film, and theater actress. She is mainly known for her roles in Catalan television series such as Moebius, El cor de la ciutat and Cites. In addition, she has also participated in films such as Tres días con la familia and Forasters. She is also part of the electronic pop group Nuu.

Biography 
She trained as an actress at the Nancy Tuñón School in Barcelona and graduated as a singer at L'AULA (Conservatory of Modern Music and Jazz of the Liceu Foundation), as well as being certified in 2017 as a Fitzmaurice Voicework teacher.

She is mainly known by the Catalan public for her participation in the after-dinner series El cor de la ciutat, where she played Eli, a vital and rebellious young woman who, together with a group of companions, occupies a historic building in the city of Barcelona that was going to be demolished to build apartments. Being such a choral production, she coincided with the great faces of Catalan television; she shared scenes with Sandra (Nausicaa Bonnín), Ka (Laura Guiteras) and Iván (Oriol Vila) mainly. Oset joined the long-lived series in the eighth season and remained in it until its conclusion.

In 2009, she participated in the film 3 dies amb la família, a drama starring Nausicaa Bonnín and directed by Mar Coll.

In 2011, she played the role of Blanca in the TV3 miniseries Ermessenda, a historical drama about Ermesenda de Carcasona, who was Countess of Barcelona and a historical figure in the history of Catalonia.

In 2012 she participated in the film El cuerpo by Oriol Paulo in a supporting role and also in the TV3 miniseries Tornarem, about the Republican exiles of the Civil War who were involved in World War II.

In theater, She has participated in plays such as Othello, Històries d'Istanbul or Mrs. Death: un diàleg amb Espriu, among others. Between 2011 and 2012 she was part of the cast of the play The Lonesome West, an adaptation of Martin McDonagh text directed by Pepa Fluvià. In 2015, she played Hero in the TeatrE Nacional de Catalunya's large hall in an adaptation of Shakespeare's classic Molt soroll per no res directed by Àngel Llàcer. The play was very well received by audiences and critics, and even hung the "full house" sign on numerous occasions.

In 2015, she participated in two episodes of the first season of the romantic comedy Dates on TV3, an adaptation of the British Dates. Oset plays Judith, a young woman who has just ended a long-term romantic relationship and for whom her sister Ona (Júlia Molins) arranges a date without her knowledge.

From 2018 to 2021, Oset has participated in the TV series Servir y proteger, Mira lo que has hecho, and in the two seasons of the Catalan fiction Les de l'hoquei. In 2021, she premieres as the protagonist of Moebius, a series created by Eduard Cortés and Piti Español and directed by Eduard Cortés. Moebius is an investigative thriller with a Nordic feel, set in a village in inland Catalonia in which Oset plays Mamen Salvat, the new math teacher who will investigate on her own the death of one of her students.

Filmography

Cinema

Television

Theater

References 

Spanish stage actresses
Spanish television actresses
Spanish film actresses
21st-century Spanish actresses
Catalan television actors
Stage actresses from Catalonia
Catalan film actors
Actresses from Barcelona
Living people
1983 births